Fleetwood, also called Schlegelschteddel in Pennsylvania Dutch, is a borough in Berks County, Pennsylvania, United States. The population was 4,085 at the 2010 census. It was home to the Fleetwood Metal Body company, an automobile coachbuilder purchased by Fisher Body and integrated into General Motors in 1931. The name lived on in the Cadillac Fleetwood automobile.

History
The First National Bank in Fleetwood was listed on the National Register of Historic Places in 2005.

Geography
Fleetwood is located northeast of the center of Berks County at  (40.454793, -75.818821). It is bordered on the east, west, and north by Richmond Township and on its short southern edge by Ruscombmanor Township.

Demographics

As of the census of 2010, there were 4,085 people, 1,662 households, and 1,134 families residing in the borough. There were 1,720 housing units of which 96.6% were occupied. The racial makeup of the borough was 95.81% White, 0.93% African American, 0.83% Asian, 0.73% from other races, and 1.69% from two or more races.

There were 1,662 households, out of which 30.7% had children under the age of 18 living with them, 54.3% were married couples living together, 9.3% had a female householder with no husband present, and 31.8% were non-families. 25.3% of all households were made up of individuals living alone.  The average household size was 2.44 and the average family size was 2.92.

In the borough the population was spread out, with 22.1% under the age of 18, 8.8% from 18 to 24, 26.3% from 25 to 44, 26.5% from 45 to 64, and 16.3% who were 65 years of age or older. The median age was 39.9 years. For every 100 females there were 95.5 males. For every 100 females age 18 and over, there were 112.5 males.

The following statistics are from the 2000 census
The median income for a household in the borough was $48,621, and the median income for a family was $60,051. Males had a median income of $39,559 versus $26,321 for females. The per capita income for the borough was $21,600. About 2.5% of families and 2.8% of the population were below the poverty line, including 3.5% of those under age 18 and 8.1% of those age 65 or over.

An Old Order Mennonite community resides near Fleetwood. The Old Order Mennonites in the area belong to the Groffdale Conference Mennonite Church and use the horse and buggy as transportation. There are several farms in the area belonging to the Old Order Mennonite community and a meetinghouse is located near Fleetwood. The Old Order Mennonites first bought land in the area in 1949.

Education 
The community is served by the Fleetwood Area School District, which operates Fleetwood Area High School, Fleetwood Area Middle School, and two elementary schools: Andrew Maier Elementary School and Willow Creek Elementary School. Richmond Elementary School was closed at the end of the 2018-2019 school year.

Transportation

Pennsylvania Route 662 passes north-south through the borough, leading north toward U.S. Route 222 and south to Oley and Douglassville. Berks Area Regional Transportation Authority (BARTA) provides bus service to Fleetwood along Route 22, which provides a route for workers to the East Penn Manufacturing Company plant in Lyons. Norfolk Southern Railway's Reading Line freight railroad line passes east-west through Fleetwood.

Town twinnings 
Fleetwood is twinned with the town of Fleetwood in Lancashire, in the United Kingdom.

Popular culture
Jimmy Stewart drew on inspiration from seeing Fleetwood in the snow in helping to craft the vision of Bedford Falls in the 1946 film It's a Wonderful Life. 

The second episode of season one of Debris on NBC takes place on Washington Street in Fleetwood.

References

External links

 Borough of Fleetwood official website
 Fleetwood Area School District
 Fleetwood Area Historical Society
 Fleetwood Volunteer Fire Company

Populated places established in 1868
Boroughs in Berks County, Pennsylvania
1868 establishments in Pennsylvania